A Boy Called Hate is a 1995 American crime drama film starring Scott Caan, his father James Caan, Missy Crider, Adam Beach and Elliott Gould. It was the first film directed by Mitch Marcus, who also wrote the screenplay.

Plot
Steve (Scott Caan) is a maladjusted Los Angeles teenager who renames himself "Hate" following a run-in with the local police. He lives with his father (James Caan), who is bilking a former employer in a workers compensation fraud scheme. One evening while taking a motorcycle ride, Hate witnesses what appears to be an attempted rape. He shoots the would-be attacker and takes off with Cindy, the young girl being assaulted (Missy Crider). It turns out that the rapist is an assistant district attorney (Elliott Gould), who survives the shooting and falsely reports that he was the victim of a robbery. Hate and Cindy leave Los Angeles, but their situation deteriorates when Hate fatally shoots a motorcycle officer whom he mistakenly believes has come to arrest him.

Critical reaction
A Boy Called Hate had a brief theatrical release in June 1996 and received mixed reviews. Peter Stack, reviewing the film for the San Francisco Chronicle, suggested that "Two aspects of A Boy Called Hate are definitely worth the trip to the Lumiere, where the film opens today: James Caan's look-alike son, Scott, plays the lead role, and writer-director Mitch Marcus succeeds in capturing the grim essence of Los Angeles' arid outskirts as a tacky wasteland." Ella Taylor, reviewing the film for the LA Weekly wrote, "Mitch Marcus' first feature is living proof that the most fatigued of plots (young lovers-on-the-run-plus-gun) can be recharged by a director who understands the difference between exploration and exploitation."

References

External links

 

1995 films
1995 crime drama films
American crime drama films
1990s English-language films
Films directed by Mitch Marcus
1990s American films